Guadalupe-Guerra is a census-designated place (CDP) in Starr County, Texas, United States. It is a new CDP formed from part of the Fronton CDP prior to the 2010 census with a population of 37.

Geography
Guadalupe-Guerra is located at  (26.410816, -99.081881).

References

Census-designated places in Starr County, Texas
Census-designated places in Texas